Rastrick Bridge crosses the River Calder in Brighouse, West Yorkshire, England. It was built in 1558 as a replacement for an earlier wooden bridge and rebuilt c1750.

History
A wooden structure called Rastrick Bridge was recorded as being present in 1275. The bridge was replaced by one built with timber donated by John Hanson in 1514. Hanson's son funded a stone replacement for this bridge in 1558.

References

See also
List of crossings of the River Calder

Bridges over the River Calder
Bridges completed in 1558
Bridges in West Yorkshire
Brighouse